The Vienna Review was founded in 2006 by American journalist and director of the Vienna Journalism Institute Dardis McNamee. It was a monthly English language newspaper based in Vienna, Austria, available in print and online. The paper's target audience was the permanent English-speaking community in Austria and Central Europe, as well as expatriates and tourists.

Content
The Vienna Review started out as a student newspaper based in the Vienna campus of Webster University. Although Vienna was the focus, the paper made use of Austria's Central European location in covering both Western and Eastern European news and events, and seeking to provide a voice and a forum for Vienna’s international community. Contributors to the paper included writing professionals, academics from think tanks in the area. The paper was a member of Project Syndicate, the Prague-based syndication service supported by the Open Society Foundations.

Contribution
The Vienna Review was published in English on a monthly basis by the Vienna Review Publishing GmbH, since 2011 part of the Falter Verlagsgesellschaft mbH. The Vienna Review had a circulation of about 10,000 copies per month and was available by subscription, at public newsstands, in coffee houses, hotels and such places, and on several airlines.
The magazine ceased being published in January 2014. The editorial team proceeded to found a new publication called Metropole – Vienna in English, published by Home Town Media GmbH, a publishing house founded in October 2015.

References

External links
 Official Site

2006 establishments in Austria
2013 disestablishments in Austria
Defunct newspapers published in Austria
English-language newspapers published in Europe
Monthly newspapers
Newspapers published in Vienna
Publications established in 2006
Publications disestablished in 2013
Student newspapers
Webster University